Ray Whittaker (born 15 January 1945 in Bow, London) is an English former footballer.

Career
Whittaker started his career as a youth team player at Arsenal before moving to Luton Town, where he made 170 appearances and scored 40 goals. He shared the honour of top scorer for Luton with Bruce Rioch in the 1966-67 season, scoring 11 goals. After six years at the club he moved to Colchester United in 1969. He retired from football at the young age of 26.

Honours

Club
Luton Town
 Football League Fourth Division Winner (1): 1967–68

References

1945 births
Footballers from Bow, London
Living people
Association football midfielders
Arsenal F.C. players
Colchester United F.C. players
Luton Town F.C. players
English Football League players
English footballers